Ścibor is a Polish surname. Notable people with this surname include:

 Aleksander Ścibor-Rylski (1928–1983), Polish filmmaker
 Andrzej Ścibor-Bogusławski (died 1729), Polish nobleman
 Ignacy Ścibor Marchocki (1755–1827), Polish nobleman
 Krystyna Ścibor-Bogusławska (died 1783), Polish politician
 Zbigniew Ścibor-Rylski (1917–2018), Polish general

See also 
 

Polish-language surnames